INPE may refer to:

National Institute for Space Research in Brazil (Instituto Nacional de Pesquisas Espaciais)
National Penitentiary Institute of Peru (Instituto Nacional Penitenciario)
National Penitentiary and Prison Institute of Colombia (Instituto Nacional Penitenciario y Carcelario)

See also 
 National Penitentiary Institute (disambiguation)